Abandon is a 2002 American psychological thriller drama film written and directed by Stephen Gaghan in his directorial debut. It stars Katie Holmes as a college student whose boyfriend (Charlie Hunnam) disappeared two years previously. Despite being set at an American university, much of the movie was filmed in Canada at McGill University's McConnell Hall. It is based on the book Adams Fall by Sean Desmond. The book was re-titled Abandon for the movie tie-in paperback printing. The film co-stars Zooey Deschanel, Gabrielle Union and Melanie Lynskey, with Benjamin Bratt playing the detective investigating the boyfriend's disappearance. It received generally negative reviews.

Plot
Senior college student Katie Burke is struggling to deal with the stress of completing her thesis and succeeding in an upcoming rigorous interview process. To make matters even more complicated, Detective Wade Handler, a recovering alcoholic, reopens the two-year-old police investigation into the disappearance of her boyfriend, Embry Larkin. An orphaned young man of considerable means, Embry had purchased two tickets to Athens, Greece before his disappearance; the tickets had never been used and Embry's financial assets had not been touched since his disappearance. With the official reopening of the Larkin case, however, Katie begins to see Embry lurking around campus, seemingly stalking her.

Reporting this back to Detective Handler, who dismisses her as he believes Embry to be dead, Katie is not convinced but nevertheless returns to school. Falling asleep in the college library while studying, upon waking she finds a number carved into the wood of the desk. Upon investigation, she discovers it references a library book: The Inferno. There she finds Embry staring back at her from the other side of the book stack.

Confiding these troubling events to her friends, most notably her roommate Samantha, Katie learns that during her relationship with Embry, he had acted extremely jealous and even violent toward another of Katie's admirers, Harrison, for whom Katie held only platonic feelings. Shortly thereafter, Harrison seemingly disappears from campus. Convinced that Embry is responsible, Katie confronts him at a local restaurant, only to be asked to meet him at his family's country house.

Once at the Larkin family's country house, however, a violent confrontation ensues between Katie and Embry. Fleeing from the house and finding comfort in Handler, Katie begins an affair with the detective which spurs her to complete her thesis. With Handler closing the investigation, citing that Embry Larkin was indeed alive, and resigning from his job as a detective, he and Katie plan on temporarily retreating to Handler's cabin in New Hampshire. Meanwhile, however, Handler learns from a forensic expert that a note which had supposedly only recently been written by Embry to Katie was, in fact, two years old.

Waiting for Handler on campus, Katie is once again attacked by Embry, who promises to find her wherever she goes before running off. Informing Handler of her encounter with Embry, Katie asks him if the two of them can just leave, but Handler insists on putting a stop to Embry's threats. Following Katie's direction to where Embry ran off, Handler and Katie venture into Embry's former dormitory, which is now abandoned due to the building's derelict structure. As they walk into one of the building's old tunnels, a former spot for Katie and Embry's trysts, Katie begins to interact with Embry, but Handler sees no one.

Through flashbacks, Katie and Embry have been in the same location two years prior, with Embry cruelly breaking up with her and calling off their planned trip to Greece. It is subsequently revealed that as a repercussion of her father's abandonment of her at a young age, Katie possesses severe psychotic tendencies surrounding abandonment. Distraught over Embry's disposal of her, Katie picks up a rock and strikes him from behind repeatedly, killing him.

Attempting to reason with Katie before telling her she cannot come with him to New Hampshire, Handler takes notice of something at the bottom of the water. Realizing that it is the skeleton of Embry Larkin, Handler is suddenly struck from behind and falls into the water, echoing Embry's murder two years prior. The epilogue reveals that the dormitory is to be demolished for the construction of a new structure on the site, thus cementing the permanent disappearance of Embry Larkin and Wade Handler.

Katie Burke has graduated, and finally gets the job she has always wanted. But co-worker Robert Hanson informs her that he has been promoted and that their relationship must end; a familiar look passes over Katie's face.

Cast
 Katie Holmes as Katie Burke
 Benjamin Bratt as Detective Wade Handler
 Charlie Hunnam as Embry Larkin
 Zooey Deschanel as Samantha Harper
 Fred Ward as Lieutenant Bill Stayton
 Mark Feuerstein as Robert Hanson
 Melanie Lynskey as Julie 'Mousy Julie'
 Philip Bosco as Professor Jergensen
 Gabriel Mann as Harrison Hobart
 Will McCormack as August
 Gabrielle Union as Amanda Luttrell
 Tony Goldwyn as Dr. David Schaffer

Release

Box office
The film opened at #7 at the U.S. box office, taking $5,064,077 in its first opening weekend.

Critical reception
Reception was largely negative. Rotten Tomatoes judged the film to have a 16% "rotten" critical approval rating based on 113 reviews, with an average score of 4.28/10, summarizing critical opinion in saying that the plotline is "disjointed and muddled". On Metacritic, the film's score is 36/100 based on 26 reviews, indicating generally unfavorable reception. Variety magazine described it as "a tricked-up Fatal Attraction wannabe".

Audiences polled by CinemaScore gave the film an average grade of "D" on an A+ to F scale.

See also

Adams Fall, a novel by author Sean Desmond, which served as a loose basis for the plot of Abandon

References

External links

Abandon at Metacritic

Review of the book on which the film is based, Adams Fall by Sean Desmond

2002 films
2002 directorial debut films
2002 psychological thriller films
2002 romantic drama films
2002 thriller drama films
2000s English-language films
2000s mystery thriller films
American mystery thriller films
American nonlinear narrative films
American psychological thriller films
American romantic drama films
American thriller drama films
Films based on American thriller novels
Films based on mystery novels
Films based on romance novels
Films directed by Stephen Gaghan
Films produced by Roger Birnbaum
Films produced by Lynda Obst
Films scored by Clint Mansell
Films set in universities and colleges
Films shot in Montreal
Films with screenplays by Stephen Gaghan
Paramount Pictures films
Spyglass Entertainment films
2000s American films